Dirngulbai Moreyna "UB" Misech (born 27 September 1997) is a female Palauan swimmer and represents her country at international swimming competitions. She holds seven national records.

She competed in the 50 m freestyle, 100 m freestyle and 50 m butterfly events at the 2012 FINA World Swimming Championships (25 m). Misech also competed in the 50 m and 100 m freestyle events at the 2013 World Aquatics Championships. Most recently she competed at the 2014 FINA World Swimming Championships (25 m), 2014 Summer Youth Olympics and 2015 World Aquatics Championships.

National records
In 2015, she broke the Palauan record (her own) for the 100m butterfly during the 2015 Pacific Games and had broken a number of national records (400 meter freestyle, 100 meter butterfly, 1500 meter freestyle and 400 meter individual medley) at the Saipan International Meet.
As of April 2016 she owns 21 Palauan records.

Long course (50 m)

Women's records

Mixed relay

Short course (25 m)

References

External links
 
 Profile at the-sports.org
 Profile at pf2015.gems.pro
 Profile at collegeswimming.com
 Profile at swimtimes.nl

1997 births
Living people
People from Koror
Palauan female swimmers
Swimmers at the 2014 Summer Youth Olympics
Female butterfly swimmers
Swimmers at the 2016 Summer Olympics
Olympic swimmers of Palau
Palauan female freestyle swimmers